Mary Adeola Temitope Asake Durojaye, or simply Mary Durojaye, (born 14 July 1990 in London, United Kingdom) is a British female professional basketball player of Nigerian descent.

External links
Profile at eurobasket.com

1990 births
Living people
Basketball players from Greater London
English people of Nigerian descent
British women's basketball players
Nigerian women's basketball players
Forwards (basketball)
English people of Yoruba descent
Yoruba sportswomen